Michael Greenberg (born 1952) is the author of the best-selling memoir Hurry Down Sunshine  (Other Press, 2008),  which depicts his daughter's battle with bipolar disorder, and Beg, Borrow, Steal (Other Press, 2009), a New York writer's memoir.

Greenberg is a columnist for The Times Literary Supplement, where he has cultivated a distinctive "quirky New York Jewish voice." He is also a contributor to The Village Voice, The New York Review of Books, Bomb, and The Boston Review. 

Greenberg lives in New York City.

References

External links

Other Press author page for Michael Greenberg
Michael Greenberg homepage
Seattle Times review of Hurry Down Sunshine by Barbara Lloyd McMichael
RainTaxi review of Hurry Down Sunshine by Jacob Appel.
St. Louis Post-Dispatch review of Hurry Down Sunshine by Theresa Tighe.

Living people
American essayists
American memoirists
1952 births